Platts Shadrach Gollings (1878–1935) was an English footballer who played in the Football League for West Bromwich Albion.

References

1878 births
1935 deaths
English footballers
Association football wing halves
English Football League players
Hereford Thistle F.C. players
West Bromwich Albion F.C. players
Brierley Hill Alliance F.C. players
Hereford Town F.C. players